Gondlanwala is a village located in Gujranwala district in the region of Pakistan's Punjab. The nearest city is Gujranwala that is 3 miles away from Gondlanwala.

References 

Villages in Gujranwala District